Drilliola emendata is a species of sea snail, a marine gastropod mollusk in the family Borsoniidae.

Description
The brown shell grows to a length of 9 mm. The whorls show three cingulae and two lirae. The body whorl is spirally multicingulate and
longitudinally lirulate. The suture is slightly but distinctly incised. The aperture is white within. The siphonal canal is short and wide. The sinus is wide between the first and second carina.

Distribution
This species occurs in the Mediterranean Sea off Greece and Sicily.

References

 Nordsieck F., 1971: Kontinentale und abyssische Meeresmollusken des Jonischen Meeres ; Archiv für Molluskenkunde 101: 187–190
 Bouchet, P. & Warén, A., 1980. Revision of the northeast Atlantic bathyal and abyssal Turridae (Mollusca, Gastropoda). Journal of Molluscan Studies: 1–119, sér. Suppl.8
 Gofas, S.; Le Renard, J.; Bouchet, P. (2001). Mollusca, in: Costello, M.J. et al. (Ed.) (2001). European register of marine species: a check-list of the marine species in Europe and a bibliography of guides to their identification. Collection Patrimoines Naturels, 50: pp. 180–213

External links
 Locard A. (1897–1898). Expéditions scientifiques du Travailleur et du Talisman pendant les années 1880, 1881, 1882 et 1883. Mollusques testacés. Paris, Masson. vol. 1 (1897), p. 1-516 pl. 1-22; vol. 2 (1898), p. 1-515, pl. 1-18
 
 MNHN, Paris: lectotype

emendata
Gastropods described in 1872